Philip Bedingfield (died 1660) was an English landowner and politician who sat in the House of Commons in 1654.

Bedingfield was  the son of Thomas Bedingfield of Darsham, Suffolk and his wife  Dorothy Southwell, daughter of John Southwell of Barham. He was  admitted at Emmanuel College, Cambridge on 1 May 1609, and at Gray's Inn on 17 February 1611. In 1636 he inherited the estate of Darsham on the death of his father but appears to have settled at Ditchingham, Norfolk.

In 1654, Bedingfield was elected Member of Parliament for Norfolk in the First Protectorate Parliament.  
   
Bedingfield died in 1660 and was buried at Ditchingham on 6 March 1660.

References

Year of birth missing
1660 deaths
English MPs 1654–1655
Alumni of Emmanuel College, Cambridge
Members of Gray's Inn
People from Ditchingham
Members of the Parliament of England for Norfolk